Skøyenåsen is a station on the Østensjø Line (Line 3) on the Oslo Metro, located between the stations of Godlia and Oppsal,  from Stortinget. The station was opened as a subway station 29 October 1967. Karl Stenersen was the station's architect. Rail service through Godlia is older, having opened as a tram line already in 1926.

References

External links

Oslo Metro stations in Oslo
Railway stations opened in 1967
1967 establishments in Norway